KLUF-LD, UHF digital channel 27 (virtual channel 5), is a low-powered TBN-affiliated television station licensed to Lufkin, Texas, United States. The station is owned by the International Broadcasting Network.

External links

LUF-LD
Television channels and stations established in 1988
1988 establishments in Texas
Low-power television stations in the United States